Lucky Club Casino and Hotel is a casino and 118-room hotel located on  in North Las Vegas, Nevada.  The casino is owned and operated by Fifth Street Gaming.

History

Budget Host Inn
In June 1995, after spending eight years in bankruptcy, the Budget Host Inn was acquired at auction for $1.1 million by Shawn Scott, owner of the Post Office Casino in Henderson.

Cheyenne Hotel (1995-99)
Scott renamed it as the Cheyenne Hotel, and made plans to revitalize the run-down property, including reopening the restaurant and lounge and adding a hotel tower and a casino, taking advantage of the site's grandfathered gaming status. He requested a license for 75 slot machines and 2 table games, but the Nevada Gaming Commission in December 1996 issued only an 11-month limited license for 25 machines, finding his record management to be sloppy. By 1997, the Cheyenne was operating as a Days Inn.

In 1998, MTR Gaming, the West Virginia-based parent company of the Mountaineer Racetrack, acquired the Cheyenne for $5.5 million in cash.

Ramada Hotel and Speedway Casino (1999-2008)
MTR said it would complete an expansion already in progress, adding  of gaming space with  350 slot machines and 5 table games, and would rename the property as the Speedway Hotel & Casino and add a motor racing theme, in reference to the nearby Las Vegas Motor Speedway. The hotel became a Ramada Inn. The casino opened in March 1999, leased to Dynasty Games, with 143 slot machines. MTR received its gaming license the following September, and said it would take over operation of the casino on October 1. The official grand opening was held in March 2000, with the casino having expanded to over 300 slot machines, with table games and a Leroy's sportsbook, racing-themed dining areas, and a racecar simulator.

By November 2000, the property had failed to turn a profit, and was taking measures to attract value-conscious guests, including Hispanics, Nellis Air Force Base personnel, and North Las Vegas residents. By 2004, MTR was reporting annual net revenue of $9.8 million at the Speedway.

In February 2007, MTR agreed to sell the complex to Mandekic Cos. for $18.2 million. Mandekic assigned its agreement in May to Ganaste, LLC, a partnership of three investors managed by Seth Schorr, son of Wynn Resorts COO Marc Schorr. The buyers hoped to use the Speedway as a training ground to learn the gaming business before moving on to other acquisitions. The sale of the land and buildings was completed in January 2008 for $11.4 million, with MTR continuing to operate the casino, leasing it for $70,000 a month.

Lucky Club Hotel and Casino (2008-present)
Ganaste took full ownership in June 2008, and promptly renamed the property as the Lucky Club Casino and Hotel.

An electrical fire on June 9, 2008 forced the casino to close for two weeks while critical equipment was repaired.
Nevada Gaming Commission approvals in 2013 indicated that a reorganization plan was approved and new ownership was held by Lucky Silver Gaming (LSG). LSG is owned by Seth Schorr, Jeff Fine and other partners.

In 2018, the property was listed for sale with an asking price of $13 million, but it was not sold.

Plans were announced in 2022 to renovate and rebrand the property to cater to the Latino community, centered around the addition of an Ojos Locos sports bar. it will be rebranded as Ojos Locos Sports Cantina y Casino at Hotel Jefe

References

External links
 

Buildings and structures in North Las Vegas, Nevada
Hotels in the Las Vegas Valley
Casinos in the Las Vegas Valley
Casinos completed in 2000
Hotel buildings completed in 2000
Hotels established in 2000
Casino hotels